Lonnie Jewel Shelton (October 19, 1955 – July 8, 2018) was an American National Basketball Association (NBA) player who played from 1976 to 1985.

Early years
Shelton played college basketball for Oregon State University.  He was drafted by the Memphis Sounds (soon to become the Baltimore Claws) of the American Basketball Association in 1975 but elected to stay in college.  He was then selected by the New York Knicks in the second round of the 1976 NBA draft.

Professional career
Shelton led the NBA in personal fouls in his first two seasons with New York. On December 16, 1977, Shelton scored a career-high 41 points during a 152–150 triple overtime loss to the Milwaukee Bucks. After the Knicks obtained free agent Marvin Webster from the SuperSonics in 1978, the NBA awarded Shelton and the Knicks’ 1979 first-round pick to Seattle as compensation.

In 1979, his first season with the SuperSonics, Shelton was the team's starting power forward.  That season, he set a SuperSonics record by going 13 for 13 from the field in a game (17 total consecutive field goals), and helped the SuperSonics win the NBA Finals.  Shelton was one of three SuperSonics represented in the 1982 NBA All-Star Game (along with Jack Sikma and Gus Williams) and was named to the NBA's 1982 2nd All-Defense Team.  Shelton played five seasons with the Seattle SuperSonics and finishing his career playing for the Cleveland Cavaliers for three seasons.

Personal life
Shelton's sons include L. J., who played offensive tackle in the NFL, Tim Shelton, who played for the San Diego State Aztecs basketball team, Titus Shelton, who played for the Cal Poly San Luis Obispo Mustangs basketball team from 2005–2009, and Marlon, who played for the Washington Huskies from 1998 to 2003.
He has multiple grandchildren.

Death
Shelton died on July 8, 2018 at age 62 in Westminster, California of complications from a heart attack on May 5 which left him in a coma.

NBA career statistics

Regular season 

|-
| style="text-align:left;"| 
| style="text-align:left;"|New York
| 82 || - || 25.7 || .476 || - || .707 || 7.7 || 1.8 || 1.5 || 1.2 || 11.6
|-
| style="text-align:left;"| 
| style="text-align:left;"|New York
| 82 || - || 28.3 || .514 || - || .736 || 7.1 || 2.4 || 1.3 || 1.4 || 14.9
|-
| style="text-align:left;background:#afe6ba;"|†
| style="text-align:left;"|Seattle
| 76 || - || 28.4 || .519 || - || .693 || 6.2 || 1.4 || 1.0 || 1.0 || 13.5
|-
| style="text-align:left;"| 
| style="text-align:left;"|Seattle
| 76 || - || 29.5 || .530 || .200 || .763 || 7.7 || 1.9 || 1.2 || 1.0 || 13.6
|-
| style="text-align:left;"| 
| style="text-align:left;"|Seattle
| 14 || - || 31.4 || .420 || - || .655 || 5.6 || 2.5 || 1.6 || .2 || 13.0
|-
| style="text-align:left;"| 
| style="text-align:left;"|Seattle
| 81 || 81 || 32.9 || .486 || .000 || .783 || 6.3 || 3.1 || 1.2 || .5 || 14.9
|-
| style="text-align:left;"| 
| style="text-align:left;"|Seattle
| 82 || 79 || 31.4 || .478 || .167 || .754 || 6.0 || 2.9 || .9 || .9 || 12.4
|-
| style="text-align:left;"| 
| style="text-align:left;"|Cleveland
| 79 || 78 || 26.6 || .476 || .200 || .764 || 4.8 || 2.3 || 1.0 || .7 || 10.8
|-
| style="text-align:left;"| 
| style="text-align:left;"|Cleveland
| 57 || 14 || 21.8 || .435 || .000 || .662 || 4.7 || 1.7 || .8 || .3 || 6.4
|-
| style="text-align:left;"| 
| style="text-align:left;"|Cleveland
| 44 || 1 || 15.5 || .489 || .000 || .875 || 3.3 || 1.4 || .5 || .1 || 4.5
|- class="sortbottom"
| style="text-align:center;" colspan="2"| Career
| 673 || 253 || 27.5 || .492 || .097 || .738 || 6.1 || 2.2 || 1.1 || .8 || 12.0
|- class="sortbottom"
| style="text-align:center;" colspan="2"| All-Star
| 1 || 1 || 20.0 || 1.000 || - || .500 || 9.0 || 1.0 || 1.0 || .0 || 7.0

Playoffs 

|-
|style="text-align:left;"|1978
|style="text-align:left;”|New York
|6||-||25.2||.536||-||.750||7.3||2.8||.3||.8||11.0
|-
| style="text-align:left;background:#afe6ba;"|1979†
|style="text-align:left;”|Seattle
|17||-||33.3||.483||-||.692||8.4||2.0||1.1||1.1||12.9
|-
|style="text-align:left;"|1980
|style="text-align:left;”|Seattle
|15||-||31.3||.507||.000||.627||8.3||1.7||1.5||.8||12.0
|-
|style="text-align:left;"|1982
|style="text-align:left;”|Seattle
|8||-||33.3||.471||-||.688||7.4||2.0||.6||.9||12.8
|-
|style="text-align:left;"|1983
|style="text-align:left;”|Seattle
|2||-||26.5||.174||.000||.400||10.5||2.5||.5||.0||5.0
|-
|style="text-align:left;"|1985
|style="text-align:left;”|Cleveland
|4||0||26.5||.559||-||.800||5.5||1.0||.5||.3||11.5
|- class="sortbottom"
| style="text-align:center;" colspan="2"| Career
| 52 || 0 || 31.0 || .485 || .000 || .667 || 7.9 || 1.9 || 1.0 || .8 || 12.0

References

External links
Database Basketball: Stats

1955 births
2018 deaths
African-American basketball players
Basketball players from Bakersfield, California
Cleveland Cavaliers players
Memphis Sounds draft picks
National Basketball Association All-Stars
New York Knicks draft picks
New York Knicks players
Oregon State Beavers men's basketball players
Power forwards (basketball)
Seattle SuperSonics players
American men's basketball players
20th-century African-American sportspeople
21st-century African-American people